Christo Lloyd Davids (born 20 August 1983) is a South African filmmaker and actor. He is known for his roles in the films Forgiveness, Ernest in the Army and A Boy Called Twist. He co-owns the production company Jester Productions with Jody Abrahams and Diaan Lawrence. He is also the Artistic Director of Cape Heart Theatre Company.

Personal life
Davids was born in Simon's Town, Cape Town. Until the age of nine, he lived in Eastridge, Mitchells Plain. After that, he relocated to Heidelberg and lived with his late grandfather Goliath Davids.

He married Cindy Davids in 2013. The couple have two children; the elder child Elijah was born in 2016.

Career
Davids was 11 when he began his career in the series Onder Engele as Dial September in 1994. For the role, he was nominated for the Artes Award for the Best Actor in a TV series in 1996. He then appeared in Hagenheim: Streng Privaat. In 1998, he made his film debut with the supporting role of Ben-Ali in the film Ernest in the Army.

In 2008, he joined the cast of the SABC2 soap opera 7de Laan as Errol Pieterse, a role he would play for nine years. In 2010, he wrote the short film Bullets Over Bishop Lavis, which received critics acclaim, premiered at the KKNK 2011 and later ran at the Baxter Theatre in March 2011. In 2014, he appeared in the films Boy Called Twist and Forgiveness. In 2015, he was the program host at the Carnival of the Mossel Bay Correctional Services, hosted at the Youth Centre.

In 2016, he began to direct some episodes of the soapie 7de Laan. As of 2019, he has directed 25 episodes in total. In 2020, he directed 26 episodes of Takalani Sesame. That same tear, he produced the tribute play Van Wyk, The Storyteller of Riverlea, based on the life of late writer, political activist and poet Chris Van Wyk. In 2021, he wrote the script of two direct-to-video films Nagvrees and Krismisboks.

Filmography

References

External links
 IMDb

Living people
South African male film actors
South African male television actors
South African male stage actors
1983 births